Eemeli Suomi (born 4 December 1995) is a Finnish ice hockey forward currently playing for Ilves of the Finnish Liiga.  In the 2019-20 season, Suomi's 26 goals scored tied for third in Liiga with Lauri Pajuniemi, behind just Julius Nättinen and Justin Danforth.

References

External links
 

1995 births
Living people
Ilves players
Finnish ice hockey forwards
Ice hockey people from Tampere